A Mouse Divided is a 1953 Merrie Melodies animated short directed by Friz Freleng. The short was released on January 31, 1953, and stars Sylvester.

The title is a pun on Lincoln's House Divided Speech.

Plot
The short begins at a party at a stork club from which a drunken stork leaves to deliver a baby. Elsewhere, Sylvester shrugs off his wife's desire of wanting a baby, even mocking her brief depression over his objection ("And what thanks do I get? I wish I was dead! Boo hoo hoo! Every day it's the same thing - pitter-patter of little feet!"). Meanwhile, the drunken stork arrives in their neighborhood and, exhausted and unable to continue to his intended destination, drops the bundle off at the nearest house- theirs. Sylvester's wife, despite being surprised at the stork’s public drunkenness, graciously receives the package and Sylvester, despite his earlier objection, is nonetheless excited at the prospect of being a father- until he learns the baby is a mouseling, at which point he tries to eat it. His wife, who immediately becomes endeared to the mouse after the baby calls her "Mama," quickly stops Sylvester twice (telling him that "mouse or no mouse, he's your son!") Later, when she goes out (and is not seen again afterwards), he tries again, but stops after the mouse calls him "Daddy", which causes Sylvester's heart to melt.

Sylvester's attitude toward the mouse changes entirely from this point on, becoming a dotting father and deciding to take his false son for a walk in a baby carriage. Unfortunately, the neighborhood cats are not as enamored of the mouse, forcing Sylvester to run back into the house. Several cats try to steal the mouse, only to be foiled each time by Sylvester, who for once is on the winning end of the same traps and tactics by which he usually ends up getting foiled: climbing through a window, posing as a rapidly talking vacuum cleaner salesman ("Good day, sir! I represent the Little Giant Vacuum Cleaner Company of Walla Walla, Washington and if you watch closely, you'll notice the powerful action of this machine as it removes completely and forever all foreign particles from around the room! I realize that you may not be ready to purchase the Little Giant right now but if you ever do, just remember the Little Giant Vacuum Cleaner Company of Walla Walla, Washington!"), a teenage babysitter disguise (Sylvester simply slams the door on the cat), cutting a hole in the floor beneath the mouse's cradle (Sylvester substitutes the mouse with a stick of dynamite), a Santa disguise (Sylvester sees the calendar says July and blows the cat over the horizon with another dynamite stick) and finally forgoing tricks and simply using a tree trunk to try and break the door down (Sylvester opens it just before impact).

The (still drunk) stork, meanwhile, returns under direct orders to retrieve the mouse and deliver him to his actual parents by fishing him out with a piece of cheese ("What a fuss they made at the office [hic!]. Now I gotta get the mouse to his real parents [hic!]."). Sylvester, believing it to be another cat, quickly stops the mouse and is pulled up instead with the stork thinking he is the mouse ("Boy [hic!], did that mouse grow!"). A later scene reveals a married mice couple walking a disgruntled Sylvester (dressed as a baby) with the wife telling her husband, "Well, nothing like this ever happened on my side of the family," before he looks at the audience in bewilderment as the cartoon irises out.

Voice Cast
 All Other Voices are provided by Mel Blanc
 Bea Benaderet voices Mrs. Sylvester, Female Mouse

References

External links
 

1953 films
1953 animated films
1953 short films
Merrie Melodies short films
Short films directed by Friz Freleng
Animated films about cats
Animated films about mice
Films scored by Carl Stalling
1950s Warner Bros. animated short films
1950s English-language films
Sylvester the Cat films
Films about babies